Transport International Holdings Limited, formerly known as the Kowloon Motor Bus Holdings Limited, is a public transport operator in Hong Kong, and some cities in China, including joint ventures in Beijing and Shenzhen.

In 1961, Kowloon Motor Bus Holdings was listed on the Hong Kong Stock Exchange as parent company of Kowloon Motor Bus. In 2005, the company was renamed Transport International Holdings.

Sun Hung Kai Properties is its largest shareholder with 33% interest.

Subsidiaries
Transport International's business units are:
 The Kowloon Motor Bus Company (1933) Limited
 Long Win Bus Company Limited - founded 1997
 Sun Bus Holdings Limited - founded in 1998 as a non-franchised bus operator providing premium and value-for money tailor-made transportation services (e.g. residential bus service, shuttle bus, tour coach)
 New Hong Kong Bus Company Limited - operator of Lok Ma Chau – Huanggang Cross-boundary shuttle bus service
 Lai Chi Kok Properties Investment Limited
 KMB Financial Services Limited
 RoadShow Holdings Limited - founded 2000 to provide multi-media on-board KMB buses

Joint ventures
Beijing Beiqi Kowloon Taxi Company Limited
Shenzhen Bus Group Company Limited - 35% shareholding founded in 2005, it is a provider of bus/mini-bus, limousine, coach, and taxi services in Shenzhen

See also
Bravo Transport - Parent company of rival operators Citybus and New World First Bus
 - Another transportation holding company in Hong Kong which operate the franchise bus company New Lantao Bus in addition to other non-franchise services.

References

External links
Transport International official website

Companies listed on the Hong Kong Stock Exchange
Sun Hung Kai Properties